BrigandZe Rugby Compagnie is a Belgian rugby club in Berlare.

History
The club was founded in 2008.

External links
 BrigandZe Rugby Compagnie

Belgian rugby union clubs
Rugby clubs established in 2008
Berlare